Panik i tomteverstan (Panic in Santa's workshop) is the 2019 Sveriges Television's Christmas calendar directed by  Fredde Granberg and Thomas Claesson.

Cast 
 Per Andersson – Santa
 Pernilla Wahlgren – Santa's wife
 Elis Nyström
 Elisabeth Drejenstam – Papadogeorgou
 Suzanne Reuter 
 Leif Andrée – Snowman
 Marie Robertson 
 Katarina Ewerlöf 
 Christina Schollin – Santa's grandmother
 Victor Beer  
 Sven Melander 
 Allan Svensson 
 Rolf Skoglund 
 Malin Cederbladh 
 Michael Lindgren- Bertil the Krampus
 Marko ”Markoolio” Lehtosalo
 Helge Skoog

References

External links 
 

2019 Swedish television series debuts
2019 Swedish television series endings
Sveriges Television's Christmas calendar
Swedish television shows featuring puppetry
Television shows set in the Arctic
Television shows set in Sweden